Harry Edward Welch Jr. (born April 4, 1945) is a retired American football coach who is considered one of the most successful coaches in California prep football history. In a 42-year coaching career, 25 of which were as a head coach, Welch averaged over 10 wins per season and won nine California Interscholastic Federation – Southern Section (CIF-SS) Championships and three state championships. He also coached 17 CIF-SS Divisional Players of the Year in his career.

His career accomplishments include a 46-game winning streak, a 30-game winning streak, nine CIF sectional titles, including four in a row from 2006 to 2009, a Division 1 California State Championship in 2006 with Canyon High School in Canyon Country, a second California State Championship in 2008 in the Small School Division (IV) with St. Margaret's Episcopal School and finally a third State Championship with Santa Margarita Catholic High School in 2011 (Division I). He is 9–1 in CIF-SS Championship games and 3–0 in California State Championship games.

Early years
Welch was born in Baltimore, Maryland, on April 4, 1945, to Harry Edward Welch Sr. and Marie Snow. He moved to Tarzana, California, at age 9 and attended Crespi Carmelite High School, where he played quarterback before graduating in 1963. He attended Santa Clara University for one year before returning to the San Fernando Valley, where he received his bachelor's degree from California State University, Northridge in 1968. He later earned a master's degree.

Welch began his coaching career as an assistant at Crespi High in 1969. One of his notable players was Randy Cross, an offensive lineman who would go on to play at the University of California, Los Angeles and for the San Francisco 49ers. He later moved on to become an assistant coach at Los Angeles Valley College, where he served from 1974 to 1975, before returning to the high school ranks in 1976 at Canyon High.

Canyon High School
In 1982, at age 37, Welch was named the head coach of the Canyon Cowboys and served in that capacity for twelve seasons from 1982 through 1993, winning three consecutive CIF-SS Championships, posting a 46-game winning streak along the way (1983–85), and playing for a fourth title in 1988. He led Canyon to the 1983 Northwestern Conference title, defeating Bishop Montgomery 40–24 at College of the Canyons. The following year his team defeated Santa Maria 33–6 for the Northwestern Conference title at College of the Canyons. In 1985, the Cowboys made it three in a row with a 9–7 win over Antelope Valley at Canyon High School. In 1998, Canyon lost the Division II title to Antelope Valley 22–28. In 1993, after twelve successful seasons, Welch retired.

In 2001 he returned as the head coach at Canyon and led the Cowboys to two consecutive CIF-SS Division III titles in 2005 and 2006. In the 2005 Division II title game the Cowboys defeated Hart 21–13 at the Home Depot Center. His 2006 team defeated Moorpark 24–22 in the Northern Division Championship game and rolled past Concord De La Salle 27–13 on December 16, 2006, in the State Division I Championship for the first of his three state titles. By this time he had accumulated a career record of 179–46–2 in 18 seasons. He then retired again from his position at Canyon, and the football facility at Canyon High School was renamed Harry Welch Stadium in 2007.

In addition to being an accomplished football coach, Harry Welch was a distinguished English literature teacher at Canyon, and he became popular with students for his engaging Bible as Literature course.

St. Margaret's
In 2007, Welch moved to Coto de Caza, California and shortly thereafter accepted the head coaching position at (St. Margaret's Episcopal School) in San Juan Capistrano, California, coaching there for three seasons until 2009. Welch led the program to an overall 42–1 record, including a 30-game winning streak, three CIF-SS Championships and one California State Bowl Championship over this three season period, 2006–2009.

In 2007, the Tartans finished 14–0, winning the CIF-SS Northeast Division title defeating [Brentwood School), in Los Angeles, California, 37–6 at Notre Dame High School, Sherman Oaks, California. The Tartans scored a then Orange County, California record 674 points.

In 2008, the Tartans moved up a division level and finished 14–0, winning the CIF-SS East Valley Division against [Twentynine Palms High School] at St. Margaret's. The following week the Tartans achieved a historic 59–7 win in the inaugural 2008 California State Small School Championship game on December 19, 2008, against [Hamilton Union High School] at the Home Depot Center in Carson, California, to finish the season 15–0. A highlight of the 2008 season was the 742 points the team scored – the Orange County record and fourth best total in CIF-Southern Section history. Welch also achieved his 200th career win during this season against Western Christian of Covina, California, winning 58–7.

In 2009, the Tartans finished 13–1, repeating as the CIF-SS East Valley Division Champions against (Ontario Christian High School) in Ontario, California ... The road to the CIF Championship game became "CIF Playoff lore" as the Tartans traveled over (300+ miles, "one-way") to play a semifinal game against (Bishop Union High School) in Bishop, California ... Weather conditions were considered to be the "coldest recorded game" in CIF-SS history with (high winds and wind chill in single digits), but the Tartans prevailed winning 47–6 ... The following week in the CIF Championship game against (Ontario Christian High School) in Ontario, California the elements were equally as challenging as monsoon type conditions of (high winds/heavy rains) played havoc throughout the contest with the Tartans winning 12–6 ...  A highlight of the 2009 season was also achieving their fourth consecutive CIF-Southern Section title (2006–2009) which was also an Orange County record and placing the Tartans in "rare air" as one of only three programs in CIF-SS history to accomplish such a feat; Temple City, 1969–1972 and St. Bonaventure, 1999–2002 were the other two.

In 2010, with his career record now at 221–47–2, Welch resigned from his position at St. Margaret's and accepted the head coach position at Santa Margarita Catholic High School.  That same year, he was named the Crespi Man Award winner and selected to be entered into Crespi's Hall of Fame.

Santa Margarita
Welch was named the third Head Football Coach in Santa Margarita football history on January 21, 2010. After posting 3–7 seasons in 2008 and 2009, Santa Margarita hired Welch to return the program to greatness. His 2010 team finished 9–3 and posted the single best increase in year-over-year wins (six) in the school's history. The 2011 team finished 13–2 and ranked as high as no. 10 in the nation. The season culminated with a memorable 42–37 win over Bellarmine College Preparatory in the CIF Division I State Championship game at the Home Depot Center.

The 2012 team began the season ranked as high as #1 in the nation by several national publications and bolted out to a 6–0 record before finishing 9–3. The Trabuco Hills High School game in week three of the 2012 season was Welch's 300th game overall, and the 55–0 victory gave him 246 games in his first 300 contests.

Welch's most memorable wins at Santa Margarita were a 27–13 victory over San Clemente High School in the 2011 CIF-SS Pac-5 Championship game and the dramatic 42–37 win over Bellarmine in the CIF Division I State Championship Game on December 16, 2011. His team finished the season 13–2 and ranked as high as no. 10 in the nation. His 2012 team began the 2012 season ranked as high as no. 1 in the country and held that spot for the first six weeks of the season.

Prior to the 2013 season, Welch announced that his fourth year at Santa Margarita would be his last. Following a 4–6 campaign, Welch stepped down after completing his 25th season as a head coach, 42nd year of high school coaching and 44th overall in coaching (including two years at Valley College). Welch totaled 35 wins and 14 losses in his four seasons with Santa Margarita.

Awards and accomplishments
Welch was named the 2009 and 2010 Orange County Coach of the Year by the Orange County Register and 2010 Coach of the Year by the Los Angeles Times. In 2007, the California Coaches Association, an organization that includes high school, college, and NFL coaches, named him Coach of the Year. At the end of the 2009 season, the Los Angeles Daily News selected him as their Football Coach of the Decade. He was named the 2011 ABC 7 Southern California NFL High School Coach of the Year.

Welch is the only coach in California history to win three state championships with three different schools: Canyon High School in 2005, St. Margaret's in 2008 and Santa Margarita in 2011.

Welch has six CIF-SS Championships in the past seven years. As part of this impressive run he has won 84 of his last 92 games (.913) dating back to week 4 of the 2006 season. He has also won 27 of his last 29 playoff games dating back to 2005, with his last three post-season losses since then being a 21–27 overtime loss to St. Bonaventure in 2012, a 28–31 setback to Mission Viejo in 2010 and before that a 28–29 loss to Upland in 2004.

With 256 career wins, Welch is currently ranked 10th among active California coaches in career wins. With a win over Orange Lutheran in week 8 of the 2012 season, Welch became the second fastest in state history to reach 250 wins (in both fewest games: 305 and fewest seasons).

Harry Welch ended his remarkable coaching career with 256 victories, 60 losses, and 2 ties. His .821 winning percentage is second best in California history among coaches with 250 career wins.

Personal life
Welch is married to Cindee Welch and he has two daughters, Lisa St. John (married to Scott) and Julie Adam (married to Jack), and five grandchildren, Nicholas, Nathan, Kara, Evan and Riley. When not coaching football, Welch enjoys reading, travelling, fine dining at local restaurants and walking his St. Bernard, Ruby. He lives close to the high school in Coto de Caza.

References

1945 births
Living people
High school football coaches in California
Junior college football coaches in the United States
California State University, Northridge alumni
Santa Clara University alumni
Sportspeople from Baltimore
Sportspeople from Los Angeles
People from Tarzana, Los Angeles
Coaches of American football from California